Weightlifting events have been contested at Universiade three times as optional sport in 2011, 2013, and 2017.

Editions

Events
Medals are awarded in sixteen different weight classes: eight for men and eight for women.

Current records

Men

Women

Medal table
Last updated after the 2017 Summer Universiade

External links
Sports123

 
Sports at the Summer Universiade
Universiade